Mucuna is a genus of around 114 accepted species of climbing lianas (vines) and shrubs of the family Fabaceae: tribe Phaseoleae, typically found in tropical forests.

The leaves are trifoliolate, alternate, or spiraled, and the flowers are pea-like but larger, with distinctive curved petals, and occurring in racemes. Like other legumes, Mucuna plants bear pods. They are generally bat-pollinated and produce seeds that are buoyant sea-beans. These have a characteristic three-layered appearance, appearing like the eyes of a large mammal in some species and like a hamburger in others (most notably M. sloanei) and giving rise to common names like deer-eye beans, donkey-eye beans, ox-eye beans, or hamburger seed.

The name of the genus is derived from mucunã, a Tupi–Guarani word for these species.

Ecology
Some Mucuna species are used as food plants by caterpillars of Lepidoptera. These include Morpho butterflies and the two-barred flasher (Astraptes fulgerator), which is sometimes found on M. holtonii and perhaps others. The plant pathogenic fungus Mycosphaerella mucunae is named for being first discovered on Mucuna.

Uses

The pods of some species are covered in coarse hairs that contain the proteolytic enzyme mucunain and cause itchy blisters when they come in contact with skin; specific epithets such as pruriens (Latin: "itching") or urens (Latinized Ancient Greek: "stinging like a nettle") refer to this.   Other parts of the plant have medicinal properties. The plants or their extracts are sold in herbalism against a range of conditions, such as urinary tract, neurological, and menstruation disorders, constipation, edema, fevers, tuberculosis,  and helminthiases such as elephantiasis. In an experiment to test if M. pruriens might have an effect on the symptoms of Parkinson's disease, Katzenschlager et al. found that a seed powder had a comparable, if not more favourable, effect as commercial formulations of L-dopa, although the trial only consisted of four people per test group.

M. pruriens was found to increase phosphorus availability after application of rock phosphate in one Nigerian experiment. M. pruriens was used in Native American milpa agriculture.

Mucuna seeds contain a large number of antinutritional compounds. The most important is L-dopa, which the digestive system of most animals confuses with the amino acid tyrosine, causing the production of defective proteins. Other antinutrients are tannins, lectins, phytic acid, cyanogenic glycosides, and trypsin and amylase inhibitors, although all these can be removed by long cooking. M. pruriens may also contain chemicals such as serotonin, 5-HTP, nicotine, and the hallucinogenic tryptamines 5-MeO-DMT, bufotenine and dimethyltryptamine, Mucuna is not traditionally consumed as a food crop, but some preliminary experiments have shown that if the antinutrients are removed or at least brought down to safe level, the beans can be fed to livestock or people. The L-dopa content is the most important and difficult toxin to get rid of. The seeds must be extensively processed before they can be safely eaten. Diallo & Berhe found the best method was to crack open the seeds and soak them in constantly running fresh water such as under an open faucet for 36 hours, or to put them in a bag and leave in a flowing river for 72 hours, before cooking them for over an hour. Over a thousand people in the Republic of Guinea were fed a meal of Mucuna (mixed with many other ingredients) with no obvious ill effects.

Species

Plants of the World Online currently (2023) includes:

 Mucuna acuminata Graham ex Baker
 Mucuna aimun Wiriad.
 Mucuna analuciana T.M.Moura, Mansano & A.M.G.Azevedo
 Mucuna angustifolia Adema
 Mucuna argentea T.M.Moura, G.P.Lewis & A.M.G.Azevedo
 Mucuna argyrophylla Standl.
 Mucuna atropurpurea (Roxb.) DC. ex Wight
 Mucuna aurea C.B.Rob.
 Mucuna bennettii F.Muell. – red jade vine
 Mucuna biplicata Teijsm. & Binn. ex Kurz
 Mucuna birdwoodiana Tutcher
 Mucuna bodinieri H.Lév.
 Mucuna brachycarpa Rech.
 Mucuna bracteata DC. ex Kurz
 Mucuna cajamarca T.M.Moura, G.P.Lewis & A.M.G.Azevedo
 Mucuna calophylla W.W.Sm.
 Mucuna canaliculata Verdc.
 Mucuna championii Benth.
 Mucuna chiapaneca M.Sousa & T.M.Moura
 Mucuna coriacea Baker
 M. coriacea subsp. coriacea
 M. coriacea subsp. irritans (Burtt Davy) Verdc.
 Mucuna cuatrecasasii Hern.Cam. & C.Barbosa ex L.K.Ruíz
 Mucuna curranii Elmer
 Mucuna cyclocarpa F.P.Metcalf
 Mucuna diabolica Backer
 Mucuna diplax Wilmot-Dear
 Mucuna discolor Merr. & L.M.Perry
 Mucuna ecuatoriana T.M.Moura, G.P.Lewis, Mansano & A.M.G.Azevedo
 Mucuna elliptica DC.
 Mucuna elmeri Merr.
 Mucuna eurylamellata Adema
 Mucuna ferox Verdc.
 Mucuna flagellipes Vogel ex Hook.f.
 Mucuna gigantea (Willd.) DC.
 Mucuna glabra (Reinecke) Wilmot-Dear
 Mucuna glabrialata (Hauman) Verdc.
 Mucuna globulifera T.M.Moura, N.Zamora & A.M.G.Azevedo
 Mucuna gracilipes Craib
 Mucuna guangxiensis K.W.Jiang & Y.Feng Huang
 Mucuna hainanensis Hayata
 Mucuna havilandii Wiriad.
 Mucuna hirtipetala Wilmot-Dear & R.Sha
 Mucuna holtonii (Kuntze) Moldenke
 Mucuna hooglandii Verdc.
 Mucuna humblotii Drake
 Mucuna imbricata (Roxb. ex Lindl.) DC. ex Baker
 Mucuna incurvata Wilmot-Dear & R.Sha
 Mucuna interrupta Gagnep. (synonym M. nigricans)
 Mucuna japira A.M.G.Azevedo, K.Agostini & Sazima
 Mucuna jarocha T.M.Moura, Mansano, Gereau & A.M.G.Azevedo
 Mucuna kabaenensis Adema
 Mucuna kawakabuti Wiriad.
 Mucuna keyensis Burck
 Mucuna killipiana Hern.Cam. & C.Barbosa
 Mucuna klitgaardiae T.M.Moura, G.P.Lewis & A.M.G.Azevedo
 Mucuna kostermansii Wiriad.
 Mucuna lamellata Wilmot-Dear
 Mucuna lamii Verdc.
 Mucuna laticifera Ingalh., N.V.Page & S.S.Gaikwad
 Mucuna longipedunculata Merr.
 Mucuna macrobotrys Hance
 Mucuna macrocarpa Wall.
 Mucuna macrophylla Miq.
 Mucuna macropoda Baker f.
 Mucuna manongarivensis Du Puy & Labat
 Mucuna melanocarpa Hochst. ex A.Rich.
 Mucuna membranacea Hayata
 Mucuna mindorensis Merr.
 Mucuna mitis (Ruiz & Pav.) DC.
 Mucuna mollis (Kunth) DC.
 Mucuna mollissima Teijsm. & Binn. ex Kurz
 Mucuna monosperma Roxb. ex Wight
 Mucuna monticola N.Zamora, T.M.Moura & A.M.G.Azevedo
 Mucuna mooneyi T.M.Moura, Gereau & G.P.Lewis
 Mucuna mutisiana (Kunth) DC.
 Mucuna neocaledonica Baker f.
 Mucuna novoguineensis Scheff.
 Mucuna occidentalis (Hepper) T.M.Moura & G.P.Lewis
 Mucuna oligoplax Niyomdham & Wilmot-Dear
 Mucuna pachycarpa Parreno ex Wilmot-Dear
 Mucuna pacifica Hosok.
 Mucuna pallida Cordem.
 Mucuna paniculata Baker
 Mucuna papuana Adema
 Mucuna persericea (Wilmot-Dear) T.M.Moura & A.M.G.Azevedo
 Mucuna pesa De Wild.
 Mucuna platyphylla A.Gray
 Mucuna platyplekta Quisumb. & Merr.
 Mucuna poggei Taub.
 M. poggei var. pesa (De Wild.) Verdc.
 M. poggei var. poggei
 Mucuna pruriens (L.) DC. – velvet bean, cowhage, kapikachu, etc.
 Mucuna pseudoelliptica T.M.Moura, G.P.Lewis & A.M.G.Azevedo
 Mucuna reptans Verdc.
 Mucuna reticulata Burck
 Mucuna revoluta Wilmot-Dear
 Mucuna rostrata Benth.
 Mucuna sakapipei Wiriad.
 Mucuna samarensis Merr.
 Mucuna sanjappae Aitawade & S.R.Yadav 
 Mucuna schlechteri Harms
 Mucuna sempervirens Hemsl.
 Mucuna sericophylla Perkins
 Mucuna sloanei Fawc. & Rendle
 Mucuna stanleyi C.T.White
 Mucuna stans Welw. ex Baker
 Mucuna stenoplax Wilmot-Dear
 Mucuna subumbellata Wilmot-Dear
 Mucuna sumbawaensis Wiriad.
 Mucuna tapantiana N.Zamora & T.M.Moura
 Mucuna thailandica Niyomdham & Wilmot-Dear
 Mucuna tomentosa K.Schum.
 Mucuna toppingii Merr.
 Mucuna urens (L.) Medik. - type species
 Mucuna verdcourtii Wiriad.
 Mucuna warburgii K.Schum. & Lauterb.
 Mucuna yadaviana S.S.Gaikwad, Lawand & Gurav

Formerly placed here
Canavalia mattogrossensis (Barb. Rodr.) Malme (as M. mattegrossensis Barb. Rodr.)
Psophocarpus scandens (Endl.) Verdc. (as M. comorensis Vatke)

References

Further reading
 
 International Legume Database & Information Service (ILDIS) (2005): Genus Mucuna. Version 10.01, November 2005. Retrieved 2007-DEC-17.
 
 Oudhia, Pankaj (2002): Kapikachu or Cowhage (Mucuna pruriens) Crop Fact Sheet. Version of 5-9-2002. Retrieved 2007-DEC-17.

External links

Bat-Pollinated Mucuna Flowers – The Source Of Tropical Sea Beans

 
Medicinal plants
Fabaceae genera